Jack-O a 1995 American horror film directed and co-produced by Steve Latshaw and executive produced by Fred Olen Ray. It is the third collaboration between Latshaw as director and Ray as executive producer, following 1993's Dark Universe and 1994's Biohazard: The Alien Force.

Jack-O stars Linnea Quigley, Maddisen K. Krown, Gary Doles, Ryan Latshaw, and Catherine Walsh, with cameo appearances by John Carradine, Cameron Mitchell (both posthumous appearances), and Brinke Stevens. The film was released direct-to-video.

Plot
The Kelly family lives in the fictional town of Oakmoor Crossing, just before and during Halloween. The family, consisting of father David, mother Linda, and son Sean, live a normal suburban life, but are eventually visited by a stranger who identifies herself as Vivian Machen. Both the Machens and the Kellys have a long ancestral history in Oakmoor Crossing, and Vivian reveals that one of the Kelly's ancestors hanged a supposed warlock named Walter Machen, who raised up a pumpkinhead scarecrow, named Jack-O, from hell to take revenge on the Kellys. The Kelly ancestor ended up burying the monster in a shallow grave. But, through the antics of several teenagers, Jack-O is raised again and seeks revenge on the Kellys.

Cast

 Patrick Moran as Jack-O-Lantern
 Linnea Quigley as Carolyn Miller
 Maddisen K. Krown as Linda Kelly (credited as Rebecca Wicks)
 Gary Doles as David Kelly
 Ryan Latshaw as Sean/David Kelly
 Catherine Walsh as Vivian Machen
 Rachel Carter as Julie Miller
 Tom Ferda as Jim
 Bill Cross as Richard Watson
 Helen Keeling as Amanda Watson
 Thor Schweigerath as Robbie
 Christina Connell as Sarah
 Mike Conner as Arthur Kelly
 Katy Maznicki as Eunice Kelly
 John Carradine as Walter Machen
 Cameron Mitchell as Dr. Cadaver
 Brinke Stevens as Witch

Production
Jack-O features several notable low-budget film actors. Linnea Quigley plays a prominent role, and both Cameron Mitchell and John Carradine make posthumous cameo appearances.

Director Steve Latshaw had several cast and crew members that joined him on three film projects: Dark Universe (1993), Biohazard: The Alien Force (1994), and Jack-O. Fred Olen Ray served as executive producer for all three films, and Patrick Moran, who played Jack-O, had writing credits on all three as well. Additionally, Wicks and Walsh both appeared in Jack-O and Biohazard: The Alien Force. Latshaw's son, Ryan Latshaw, also appeared in all three films.

Critical response
Jack-O received largely negative reviews. According to a commentary track by Latshaw and Ray, one reviewer referred to the film as a "shit pickle".

J.R. Taylor of Entertainment Weekly gave it a grade of "B", calling it an "entertaining disaster". The film has been unfavorably compared to the 1989 horror film Pumpkinhead, with Taylor writing that Jack-O "may be ripped off from the more atmospheric Pumpkinhead", and author John Kenneth Muir calling Jack-O "a low-budget variation on the much superior" 1989 film. Muir also wrote that, while Jack-O is "undeniably ambitious"—arguing that the film "labors to make a point about political polarization and the culture war in 1990s America" through its conservative suburbanite characters—it contains "virtually no suspense and pretty bad acting too. In execution, the film is pretty indefensible [...] neither particularly scary nor particularly well-made."

Home media
Jack-O was released on VHS. In 2005, the film received a "10th Anniversary Edition" DVD release, which includes such additional content as a commentary by Steve Latshaw and Fred Olen Ray, and footage from a failed Latshaw project titled Gator Babes. The commentary by Latshaw and Ray has been noted for the combativeness between the two, up to and including "a heated argument that results in Latshaw storming out."

References

Bibliography

External links
 

1995 films
1995 horror films
American slasher films
Halloween horror films
American films about revenge
Demons in film
Films about witchcraft
American ghost films
1990s slasher films
American supernatural horror films
Supernatural slasher films
American exploitation films
American splatter films
1990s English-language films
Films set in Florida
1990s American films